This list of honorary degrees lists all honorary degrees, including honorary doctorates.

Honorary doctorates

References 

Honorary degrees